Opisthotropis alcalai, Gary's mountain keelback , is a species of natricine snake found in the Philippines.

References

Opisthotropis
Reptiles described in 1961
Reptiles of the Philippines
Taxa named by Walter Creighton Brown
Taxa named by Alan E. Leviton